The Amazon black howler (Alouatta nigerrima) is a species of howler monkey, a type of New World monkey, endemic to the south-central Amazon in Brazil. Until 2001, most authorities included it as a subspecies (or simply a taxonomically insignificant variation) of the red-handed howler, though its distinction had already been pointed out much earlier. As suggested by its name, it typically appears entirely black.

References

Amazon black howler
Mammals of Brazil
Endemic fauna of Brazil
Amazon black howler
Taxa named by Einar Lönnberg